Ernest Mathijs (born 1968 or 1969) is a professor at the University of British Columbia, where he teaches film.  He has published several books on cult films.

Career 
According to CTV News, his "specialties include movie audiences, the reception of alternative cinema and cult film."  Mathijs is primarily known for his books on cult films, such as The Cult Film Reader and 100 Cult Films, which he co-edited and co-wrote, respectively, with Xavier Mendik; Cult Cinema, which he co-wrote with Jamie Sexton; The Cinema of David Cronenberg: From Baron of Blood to Cultural Hero and John Fawcett's Ginger Snaps.  With Sexton, he is the co-editor of the Cultographies series, which examines individual cult films in the form of short books.

Personal life 
Mathijs is married to Canadian actress Emily Perkins.  He was born in Belgium.

Bibliography

References

External links 
 Ernest Mathijs at the University of British Columbia

Living people
Academic staff of the University of British Columbia
Year of birth uncertain
Year of birth missing (living people)